The Roman Catholic Diocese of Syros and Milos is a diocese located in the cities of Syros and Milos in the ecclesiastical province of Naxos, Andros, Tinos and Mykonos in Greece.

History
 1400: Established as Diocese of Syros – Milos

Ordinaries

Bishops of Syros 
 Agostino Gisolfi, OP (23 September 1592 – 1607)
 Giovanni Andrea Garga, OP (30 July 1607 – 2 October 1617)
 Giovanni Girardi, OFM (7 January 1619 – 1624)
 Domenico Marengo, OFM (27 October 1625 – 1645)
 Giovanni Mihele de Curtis, O Carm (6 May 1647 – June 1655)
 Giuseppe Guarchi (2 August 1655 – 1690)
 Antonio Giustiniani (8 February 1694 – 24 January 1701)
 Michele Caro (12 February 1703 – 18 September 1707)
 Nicolaus de Camillis (7 May 1710 – 1710)
 Nicola Portoghese, OFM (1 October 1710 – 1727)
 Giovanni Francesco Bossi, OFM Conv (28 November 1729 – 22 November 1730)
 Antonio Maturi, OFM (21 May 1731 – 13 April 1733)
 Emmanuel Caranza (13 April 1733 – June 1734)
 Dario de Longhis (25 May 1735 – 27 July 1748)
 Antonio Maturi, OFM (21 July 1749 – October 1750)
 Giacinto Giustiniani, OP (15 May 1752 – 29 May 1786)
 Giovanni Battista Fonton, OFM Conv (24 July 1786 – 16 March 1799)
 Ioannes Baptistus Russin (5 October 1800 – 14 September 1824)
 Luigi Maria Blancis da Ciriè, OFM Ref (15 March 1830 – 30 October 1851)
 Giuseppe Maria Alberti (30 October 1851 – 18 March 1880)
 Teofilo Massucci, OFM Ref (1 October 1880 – 18 February 1895)
 Theodoros Antonios Politos (27 March 1895 – 11 June 1901)
 Dominikos Darmanin (18 June 1901 – 4 March 1912)
 Antonios Makrionitis (2 July 1912 – 9 December 1936)
 Antonio Grigorios Voutsinos,  (9 June 1937 – 29 May 1947)
 Georges Xenopulos, SJ (22 February 1947 – 27 June 1974)
 Franghiskos Papamanolis, OFM Cap (27 June 1974 – 13 May 2014)
 Petros Stefanou (13 May 2014 – )

See also
Catholic Church in Greece

Sources
 GCatholic.org
 Catholic Hierarchy

Roman Catholic dioceses in Greece
Dioceses established in the 13th century
Syros
Milos